Evan James may refer to:

Evan James (poet) (1809–1878), composer of the Welsh national anthem
Evan James (rugby) (1869–1901), Welsh rugby international
Evan James (civil servant) (1846–1923), of the Indian Civil Service
Evan James (cricketer) (1918–1989), Welsh cricketer
H. Evan James (1865–1951), British Olympic fencer
Evan James (soccer) (born 1990), Canadian soccer player